Nowa Wieś  (Nova Vis’) is a village in the administrative district of Gmina Łabowa, within Nowy Sącz County, Lesser Poland Voivodeship, in southern Poland.

The village has an approximate population of 1,000.

References

Villages in Nowy Sącz County